Edinburg (sometimes spelled Edinburgh) is an unincorporated community in Scotland County, in the U.S. state of Missouri.

History
A post office called Edinburg was established in 1841, and remained in operation until 1845. The community was named after Edinburgh, in Scotland, the ancestral home of government surveyor.

References

Unincorporated communities in Scotland County, Missouri
Unincorporated communities in Missouri